Gomphostigma is a genus of flowering plants belonging to the family Scrophulariaceae.

Its native range is Southern Congo to Southern Africa.

Species:

Gomphostigma incomptum 
Gomphostigma virgatum

References

Scrophulariaceae
Scrophulariaceae genera